The following were mayors of Guildford, Surrey, England:

1417-18: Richard Woking
1422-23: Richard Woking
1424-25: Richard Eton
1425-26: Richard Woking
1426-27: Geoffrey Mudge
1523: John Daborne
1531: John Daborne
1538–39: John Daborne
1550-51: William Hammond
1566: John Austen
1902-03: H. Nevill (Conservative)
2000-01: Sallie Thornberry 
2001–02: Jennifer Eleri Powell 
2002–03: Tony Phillips 
2003–04: Gordon Alfred Bridger 
2004–05: Keith Taylor  
2005–06: Tamsy Baker 
2006–07: Angela Gunning  
2007–08: Mike Nevins 
2008–09: Jennifer Jordan 
2009–10: Pauline Searle 
2010–11: Marsha Moseley 
2011–12: Terence Patrick 
2012–13: Jennifer Jordan 
2013–14: Diana Lockyer-Nibbs 
2014–15: David Elms 
2015–16: Nikki Nelson-Smith 
2016–17: Gordon Jackson 
2017–18: Nigel Manning 
2018–19: Mike Parsons 
2019—  : Richard Billington

References

External links
List of mayors from 1974

 Guildford
Guildford
Guildford